Junki Endo (遠藤 純輝, born 8 December 1994) is a Japanese footballer who plays for J-Lease FC from 2023.

Career 

After end of the 2022 season, Endo leave from Suzuka Point Getters after four years at club.

On 20 December 2022, Endo joined to J-Lease FC for upcoming 2023 season.

Club statistics 

Updated to the end 2022 season.

References

External links

FC Gifu Official website - Profile 
Profile at Machida Zelvia
Profile at Fujieda MYFC

1994 births
Living people
Association football people from Gifu Prefecture
Japanese footballers
J2 League players
J3 League players
Japan Football League players
FC Gifu players
J.League U-22 Selection players
FC Machida Zelvia players
Suzuka Point Getters players
Association football forwards